The Djiboutians are the people inhabiting or originating from Djibouti. The country is mainly composed of two ethnic groups, the Somali and the Afar. It has many languages - though Somali and Afar are the most widely spoken ones, Arabic and French serve as the official languages. There is a small Djiboutian diaspora in North America, Europe, and Australia.

Demographics

Djibouti has a population of about 884,017 inhabitants. It is a multiethnic country. The local population grew rapidly during the latter half of the 20th century, increasing from about 69,589 in 1955 to around 869,099 by 2015. The two largest ethnic groups are the Somalis (60%) and Afars (35%). The Somali clan component is mainly composed of the Issa, followed by the Gadabuursi and the Isaaq. The remaining 5% of Djibouti's population primarily consists of Yemeni Arabs, Ethiopians and Europeans (French and Italians). Approximately 76% of local residents are urban dwellers; the remainder are pastoralists.

After the civil war in 1991, many Djiboutians emigrated abroad. Most reside in Europe, North America and the Middle East.

Culture

Djiboutians' culture is primarily rooted in Somali and Afar traditions. They speak different Cushitic languages, which are part of the larger Afro-Asiatic language family. Historically, they have been nomadic pastoralists. However, recently the population has become urbanized - today, more than half live in the capital, along with the nearby towns and villages of the interior. Poetry has been traditionally recited in the villages by special readers called gabaye. This was a way of recording the community's history and customs, as well as current events.

Cuisine

Djiboutian cuisine is a mixture of Somali, Afar, Yemeni, and French cuisine, with some additional South Asian (especially Indian) culinary influences. Local dishes are commonly prepared using Middle Eastern spices, ranging from saffron to cinnamon. Spicy dishes come in many variations, from the traditional Fah-fah or "Soupe Djiboutienne" (spicy boiled beef soup), to the yetakelt wet (spicy mixed vegetable stew). Xalwo (pronounced "halwo") or halva is a popular confection eaten during festive occasions, such as Eid celebrations or wedding receptions. Halva is made from sugar, corn starch, cardamom powder, nutmeg powder, and ghee. Peanuts are sometimes added to enhance texture and flavor. After meals, homes are traditionally perfumed using incense (cuunsi) or frankincense (lubaan), which is prepared inside an incense burner referred to as a dabqaad.

Music

Djiboutian music has Somali and Afar roots. Most Somali songs follow the pentatonic scale. That is, they only use five pitches per octave in contrast to a heptatonic (seven note) scale, often found in Western music. At first listen, Somali music might be mistaken for the sounds of nearby regions such as Ethiopia, Sudan or the Arabian Peninsula, but it is ultimately recognizable by its own unique tunes and styles. Traditional Afar music resembles the folk music of other parts of the Horn of Africa such as Ethiopia; it also contains elements of Arabic music. The history of Djibouti is recorded in the poetry and songs of its nomadic people, and goes back thousands of years to a time when the peoples of Djibouti traded hides and skins for the perfumes and spices of ancient Egypt, India, and China. Afar Oral Literature is also quite musical. Popular Djiboutian musicians include Nima Djama, Abdo Xamar Qoodh, Mohamed Ali Fourchette, Abdallah Lee, Said Xamar Qoodh, and Xabiiba Cabdilaahi.

Cinema

Storytelling is an ancient custom in Djiboutian culture. This tradition is continued by a love of cinema. The earliest forms of public film display in Djibouti were in French. In the 1920s, the first local movie theaters opened, during a time when Djibouti City was growing in size. Film theaters became a place where local residents could watch movies in a relaxed atmosphere. With the development of the local film industry, additional theaters were launched. Among these establishments was the Eden in 1934, Olympia in 1939, Le Paris in 1965, and Al Hilal in 1975.

During the 1970s, the capital city had five movie theaters, with one in each district. A few local attempts at film making were also concurrently carried out with the participation of local actors. One of these was Burta Djinka, a film in Somali directed by G. Borg in 1972. Following independence in 1977, a growing number of government-owned production and distribution companies as well as actual projection theaters sprang up.

In the 1990s two of the biggest cinemas, Odeon and Olympia, closed their doors.

Languages

The languages of Djibouti include Arabic and French (official), and Somali and Afar (primary), which are the mother tongues of the Somali and Afar ethnic groups, respectively. Both languages belong to the larger Afro-Asiatic family.

Religion

Islam entered the region very early on, as a group of persecuted Muslims had sought refuge across the Red Sea in the Horn of Africa at the urging of the Islamic prophet Muhammad. In 1900, during the early part of the colonial era, there were virtually no Christians in the area, with only about 100–300 followers coming from the schools and orphanages of the few Catholic missions in French Somaliland. Islam is the driving force behind the unity of varying ethnic groups from different parts of the country, and has significantly shaped the values and traditions of Djibouti.

Notable Djiboutians
Hassan Gouled Aptidon, first President of Djibouti from 1977 to 1999
Mahmoud Harbi, Vice-President of the Government Council of French Somaliland
Ahmed Dini Ahmed, Prime Minister of Djibouti from 1977 to 1978
Dileita Mohamed Dileita, Prime Minister of Djibouti from 2001 to 2013
Hussein Ahmed Salah, Marathon runner
Jamal Abdi Dirieh, Athlete
Ayanleh Souleiman, Professional athlete
Mouna-Hodan Ahmed, Novelist
Lula Ali Ismaïl, Djiboutian-Canadian film director
Roda Ali Wais, Athlete
Zeinab Kamel Ali, Politician
Abdourahman Waberi, Novelist
Abdo Xamar Qoodh, Musician
Ismail Hassan, Footballer
Abdi Waiss Mouhyadin, Athlete
Daher Ahmed Farah, Politician
Youssouf Hiss Bachir, Athlete
Ahmed Goumane-Roble, Politician
Abdourahman Waberi, Novelist
Nima Djama, Musician
Hasna Mohamed Dato, Politician
Mumin Gala, Athlete
Omar Farah Iltireh, Politician
Yacin Elmi Bouh, Politician
Aden Robleh Awaleh, President of the National Democratic Party
Mohamed Ali Fourchette, Musician
Shanice Dileita Mohamed, Musician
Moumin Bahdon Farah, Politician

Notes

Ethnic groups in Djibouti